Joel Damon Kelso (born 12 June 2003) is an Australian motorcycle racer who currently competes for CFMoto Racing Prüstel GP in the 2023 Moto3 World Championship. He previously competed in the FIM CEV Moto3 Junior World Championship from 2020 to 2021 with the AGR Team.

Career statistics

Supersport 300 World Championship

Races by year
(key) (Races in bold indicate pole position; races in italics indicate fastest lap)

Grand Prix motorcycle racing

By season

By class

Races by year
(key) (Races in bold indicate pole position; races in italics indicate fastest lap)

References

External links
 

2003 births
Living people
People from Nambour, Queensland
Australian motorcycle racers
Moto3 World Championship riders
Supersport 300 World Championship riders